Zhangjiajie Hehua International Airport is an airport serving Zhangjiajie, Hunan, People's Republic of China . The airport is located in Huhua village in Yongding District of Zhangjiajie. It is the second largest airport in Hunan, after Changsha Huanghua Airport, and the only international airport in the Wuling Mountains region. As of 2019 it has a capacity of 5 million passengers, 19,000 tons of cargo and  45,000 aircraft movements.

History 
In 1991 construction started on Dayong Airport, which had its first test flight in December 1993 (Dayong is the former name of Zhangjiajie City).

The airport eventually opened for commercial flights under the name Dayong Zhangjiajie Airport on 18 August 1994. In 1995 it was renamed Zhangjiajie Hehua Airport. In 1999 it served 500,000 passengers annually. 

In 2011 the first international flight (excluding Macao and Hong Kong) arrived from Seoul's Incheon International Airport.

In 2015 the second terminal opened after an 18 months construction period.

Airlines and destinations

See also
List of airports in the People's Republic of China

References

Airports in Hunan
Zhangjiajie